Dalton International is a worldwide network of Dalton Plan schools and Dalton specialists. The alumni of Dalton school are called Daltonians. The Daltonian is also the official newspaper name of Dalton International.

See also
Dalton Plan
The Dalton School

References

External links

The Dalton School website

Alternative education
International educational organizations